General elections were held in Gabon on 12 February 1961 to elect a President and the National Assembly. It was the first time a president had been elected, with Prime Minister Léon M'ba of the Gabonese Democratic Bloc being the only candidate and was elected unopposed. In the National Assembly election the Gabonese Democratic Bloc and the Gabonese Democratic and Social Union put forward a joint list of candidates unopposed under the name "National Union". Voter turnout was 98.7%.

Results

President

National Assembly

References

General
Gabon
Elections in Gabon
Single-candidate elections
Presidential elections in Gabon